The Battle of Gothenburg was a Danish attempt to destroy the Swedish squadron in Gothenburg, which was led by Olof Strömstierna. The Danes were led by the famous Peter Tordenskjold. The Swedish land defence was led by Fredrik of Hessen, and it consisted of the land batteries Billingen and Rya Nabbe with 12 guns each, and the Älvsborg fortress, who had 400 soldiers with 90 guns.

The Danish attack was intended as a surprise attack but failed, after the Swedes opened fire at them after they passed Älvsborg fortress. The bombardment was led as a cross-fire from the fortress and the Swedish ships - which went across the river - against Tordenskjold and his soldiers. After 5 hours of fighting, the Danes retreated after losing several ships.

References

www.algonet.se
www.kaparna.nu

Goteborg
Conflicts in 1717
1717 in Sweden
18th century in Gothenburg